Fabien Galthié (born 20 March 1969) is a French rugby union coach and former player, currently the head coach of the France national team. 

His usual position was at scrum-half. He played much of his club rugby for Colomiers, and later on in his career, Stade Français. Galthié won 64 caps for France, including playing in four Rugby World Cups, as well as captaining the side at the 2003 World Cup. Former France national coach Bernard Laporte has described him as the greatest scrum-half in French history. He was the IRB International Player of the Year in 2002.

Since retiring as a player, Galthié has coached Stade Français, Montpellier and Toulon in the French Top 14 competition. In 2019 he became an assistant coach of the France national team, and became head coach in 2020. In 2022 he led France to a Six Nations Grand Slam.

Playing career
Born in Cahors, Galthié began his career at a club in Tournefeuille, before joining Colomiers. He made his international debut for France against Romania in June 1991. He was called into France's 1991 Rugby World Cup squad, replacing the injured Pierre Berbizier. At the 1995 Rugby World Cup he played in the semifinal defeat to South Africa.

Galthié was a crucial member of the French team that upset New Zealand in the semifinal of the 1999 Rugby World Cup at Twickenham. In 2000, Colomiers reached the French championship final, but Galthié had to watch from the stands due to a knee injury. The club lost 28–23 to Stade Français, whom he joined the following season. In 2001 Galthié was appointed captain of France. A successful year in 2002, including a Six Nations Grand Slam, saw France dominate the 2002 IRB Awards, with Galthié named Player of the Year, as well as French coach Bernard Laporte being named Coach of the Year.

Galthié captained France at the 2003 Rugby World Cup in Australia, and secured France's bonus point against Scotland in their third game, scoring the fourth try in the game. He did not play in France's final pool game against the United States. Galthié returned for the next game, the quarterfinal against Ireland which they won convincingly, but in the semi-final they lost to England 24–7. Following their semi-final defeat, France contested the third place play-off with New Zealand. Afterwards Galthié announced his retirement from international rugby.

Galthié won his only club trophy on his last competitive match, the French championship final with Stade Français against Toulouse on 7 June 2003 at Stade de France (32–18).

Coaching career
Galthié became the coach of Stade Français in 2004 after head coach Nick Mallet departed the Paris club. Galthié was contacted by Max Guazzini to take up the coaching job. In the first season, Stade Français made it to the final of both the Top 14 and Heineken Cup finals, but were beaten by Biarritz Olympique and Toulouse respectively. The following season Stade Français were beaten by Toulouse in the Top 14 semi-final, and they were knocked out of the Heineken Cup by Leicester. He eventually won the Top 14 by beating Clermont 23–18 in 2007. He left Stade Français in 2008.

He became a TV pundit with the French public national channel France 2 and private radio Europe 1. He joined the Argentina coaching staff during their end-of-the-year tour of Europe in November and December 2008.

Galthié signed a three-year coaching contract with Montpellier in 2010. Galthié led Montpellier to a Top 14 final in his first year. His stint as coach came to an abrupt end at the end of 2014 due to poor relations with the President of Montpellier Rugby Club. In 2017–2018 he coached Toulon.

France
In 2019 Galthié was appointed as vice-head coach of the French national team, having been scheduled to succeed Jacques Brunel as head coach in 2020.

Coaching statistics

France

International matches as head coach
Note: World Rankings Column shows the World Ranking France was placed at on the following Monday after each of their matches

Record by country

Honors
Six Nations Championship
Winner: 2022
Runner-up: 2020, 2021, 2023
Grand Slam
Winner: 2022
Autumn Nations Cup
Runner-up: 2020
Giuseppe Garibaldi Trophy
Winner: 2020, 2021, 2022, 2023
Dave Gallaher Trophy
Winner: 2021
Auld Alliance Trophy
Winner: 2022, 2023
Trophée des Bicentenaires
Winner: 2022

Notes

References

1969 births
Living people
People from Cahors
French rugby union coaches
French rugby union players
World Rugby Players of the Year
Rugby union scrum-halves
Western Province (rugby union) players
US Colomiers players
Stade Français players
Stade Français coaches
France international rugby union players
France national rugby union team coaches
Montpellier Hérault Rugby
Sportspeople from Lot (department)
Expatriate rugby union players in South Africa
French expatriate rugby union players
French expatriate sportspeople in South Africa
Chevaliers of the Légion d'honneur